Ty Peter Tennant (né Martin-Moffett; born 27 March 2002) is a British television actor. He is known for his roles as Tom Gresham in the science fiction series War of the Worlds (2019–present) and young Aegon II Targaryen in the HBO fantasy series House of the Dragon (2022).

Early life
Tennant was born Ty Peter Martin-Moffett at Queen Charlotte's and Chelsea Hospital in the White City area of West London to then 17-year-old actress Georgia Moffett and grew up in Chiswick. When his mother married Scottish actor David Tennant in 2011, whom she had met in 2008, Tennant adopted Ty, who gained Tennant's surname. Tennant attended Arts Educational Schools (ArtsEd) for Sixth Form.

Career
Tennant had a brief cameo in the 2013 comedy spoof The Five(ish) Doctors Reboot. He later made his feature film debut in 2019 as a younger version of Tom Glynn-Carney's Christopher Wiseman in Tolkien. That same year, he began starring in the science fiction series War of the Worlds as Tom Gresham, the younger brother of Daisy Edgar-Jones' character Emily. He also made a guest appearance in an episode of the BBC One soap opera Casualty.

In 2021, Tennant and Sebastian Croft were cast as the Dead Boy Detectives Edwin Paine and Charles Rowland respectively in season 3 of the DC Universe series Doom Patrol. He had a cameo in Around the World in 80 Days. Tennant once again played a young Tom Glynn-Carney, this time as Aegon II Targaryen in the 2022 HBO fantasy series House of the Dragon, a Game of Thrones prequel and adaptation of George R. R. Martin's companion book Fire and Blood. In 2023, Tennant played the role of Raffy in Channel 4's standalone drama Consent.

Filmography

Film

Television

References

External links
 
 Ty Tennant at Independent Talent

Living people
2002 births
21st-century English male actors
English male film actors
English male television actors
English people of Finnish descent
English people of Guyanese descent
Male actors from London
People educated at the Arts Educational Schools
People from Chiswick